Dave Prazak is an American professional wrestling promoter and commentator. He is the co-founder of Shimmer Women Athletes.

Championships and accomplishments
Game Changer Wrestling
Indie Hall of Fame
Class of 2022

References

External links

Living people
Sportspeople from Chicago
American male professional wrestlers
Professional wrestlers from Illinois
Professional wrestling announcers
Professional wrestling promoters
Professional wrestling managers and valets
Professional wrestling referees
American company founders
Professional wrestling authority figures
Shimmer Women Athletes
Year of birth missing (living people)